Băcești is a commune in Vaslui County, Western Moldavia, Romania. 

It is composed of six villages: Armășeni, Băcești, Băbușa, Păltiniș, Țibăneștii Buhlii and Vovriești.

References

Communes in Vaslui County
Localities in Western Moldavia